The grandala (Grandala coelicolor) is a species of bird in the thrush family Turdidae. It is the only species placed in the genus Grandala. It is an arboreal insectivore. It ranges across the northeastern Indian Subcontinent and some adjoining regions, existing primarily in the low-to-mid altitudes of the Himalayas. It is found in Bhutan, India, Myanmar, and Nepal, as well as Tibet and other areas of China.

Description 
The body length of the grandala is 20.5-23 cm, and it weighs from 38 to 52 g. The plumage of the male is blue-gray, only the tail and wings are black. The plumage of the female is brownish with white stripes; rump gray-blue; the tip and underside of the wing feathers are white. Birds usually make the sounds "dew-ee" and "dewee". In young birds, the plumage is similar to females, but does not have a bluish tint on the rump and upper tail integuments.

Behaviour  
Grandala is a social bird; they feed on insects, fruits, berries.

Distribution 
The grandala lives in a vast territory. In India it is found in the Himalayas from Kashmir (Kishenganga and Liddar valleys), Himachal Pradesh, Uttarakhand through Nepal, Sikkim, and east to Arunachal Pradesh. Though grandala is a common bird in that region, no scientific studies have been conducted.

Gallery

References

External links 

 Grandala at Birds of the World website
 Meet The Grandala

Turdidae
Birds of the Himalayas
Birds of China
Birds of Tibet
Birds described in 1843
Taxonomy articles created by Polbot